Hiding and Seeking: Faith and Tolerance After the Holocaust is 2004 documentary film about Menachem Daum, an Orthodox Jew and son of German Nazi Holocaust survivors who has spent his life interviewing survivors about the impact of the Holocaust on their lives. After hearing a disturbing tape of a rabbi openly preaching "hatred" of non-Jews, Daum attempts to raise an outcry in his Brooklyn Orthodox community. When ignored by the media and community leaders, Daum decides to fly to Israel to discuss the matter with his two sons, concerned with the "ethical legacy" he is responsible for leaving them.

Hiding and Seeking was produced, written, and directed by Menachem Daum and Oren Rudavsky and aired on PBS's Point of View series in 2005. It has been met with high critical praise, receiving a 90% rating on Rotten Tomatoes.

References

External links 
 Hiding and Seeking on IMDb
 Hiding and Seeking on Rotten Tomatoes
 P.O.V. Hiding and Seeking - PBS's site dedicated to the film

2004 films
POV (TV series) films
Documentary films about Jews and Judaism
Documentary films about the Holocaust
Documentary films about racism
Films scored by John Zorn
Films about Orthodox and Hasidic Jews
2000s American films